Dactylorhiza traunsteineri, the narrow-leaved marsh orchid or Traunsteiner's dactylorhiza, is a terrestrial species of orchid native to the cooler parts of the Eastern Hemisphere. It is native to Scandinavia, the Alps, and a region extending from Germany to Western Siberia. Although said by some sources to occur in Britain and Ireland, others say that plants identified as this species are actually Dactylorhiza majalis subsp. traunsteinerioides, a view supported by genetic data.

Five subspecies are recognized as of June 2014:

Dactylorhiza traunsteineri subsp. curvifolia (F.Nyl.) Soó - Czech Republic, Sweden, Finland, northern Russia
Dactylorhiza traunsteineri subsp. irenica (F.M.Vázquez) Kreutz - Spain
Dactylorhiza traunsteineri subsp. traunsteineri - most of the species range
Dactylorhiza traunsteineri subsp. turfosa (F.Proch.) Kreutz - Austria, Czech Republic, Slovakia
Dactylorhiza traunsteineri subsp. vosagiaca Kreutz & P.Wolff - Germany

References

External links
 Den virtuella floran - Distribution

traunsteineri
Orchids of Europe
Flora of Europe
Flora of Siberia
Plants described in 1831